The Namibia Airports Company (NAC) is the national operator of eight of the largest airports in Namibia. It is a fully owned and operated state owned enterprise of the Ministry of Public Works and Transport. The NAC is a member of major international airport organizations such as the Airports Council International (ACI).

Between 2010 and 2015, NAC wanted to invest more than 1.2 billion Namibian dollars in the expansion of its airports.

Airports
The NAC operates the following airports in terms of infrastructure, maintenance, technology, flight handling, passenger handling, parking, rental of store and other space and employee development:

 Hosea Kutako International Airport at Windhoek
 Eros Airport in Windhoek
 Walvis Bay Airport in Walvis Bay
 Luderitz Airport in Luderitz
 Keetmanshoop Airport in Keetmanshoop
 Ondangwa Airport in Ondangwa
 Rundu Airport in Rundu
 Katima Mulilo (Mpacha) airport in Katima Mulilo

References

External links
Namibia Airports Company

Companies based in Windhoek
Transport companies established in 1998
Namibian companies established in 1998